Sagina is a genus of flowering plants.

Sagina may also refer to:
Sagina (film), a 1974 Hindi film

See also
Sagina Mahato, a 1970 Bengali film

Saginaw (disambiguation)